Ruslan Renatovich Fazlyev (born March 27, 1980) is a Russian Internet entrepreneur who has founded several companies. He is best known as a founder and developer of Ecwid and X-Cart e-commerce platforms.

Ruslan is number 14 in Hopes&Fears’s rating of young Russian entrepreneurs and number 56  among Russian internet millionaires according to Kommersant’s research.

Early life 
Fazlyev born in  Oktyabrsky, Republic of Bashkortostan. Ruslan has been programming since he was seven years old. At first, he used pen and paper. His first personal computer had no screen. Despite all the hardships, Ruslan practised  reverse engineering of software and created simple games. 
From 1997 to 1999, he studied at Ulyanovsk State Technical University. Ruslan dropped out of education, but nowadays he is regularly invited to lecture at USTU. 
He is married to a woman he met before starting his own business.

Career 
Ruslan claims that he became an entrepreneur only because there was no job for him in Ulyanovsk. His first e-commerce software named X-Cart was released in 2001. Fazlyev and his friends utilised the code developed for commercial websites to create the first e-commerce product written in PHP. X-Cart was aimed at small and medium business that could not afford far more expensive and complicated products such as IBM WebSphere Commerce.

Ecwid adopted the same approach in 2009. It is an e-commerce platform that can be built into any existing website or social network page. An award-winning product received a 1,5M round from the Runa Capital venture fund in December 2011 and a syndicated 5M round from Runa Capital and iTech Capital in May 2013. Ecwid has been the most popular social network trading software in the world since 2012. Ruslan is CEO of Ecwid and Board Member of X-Cart.

Long before engaging in the software business he created the first telecommunication company in Ulyanovsk. It was sold to a larger competitor in 2002.

From 2012 to 2014, Fazlyev was a member of the Expert Council for development of the Russian Ministry of Communications and Mass Media.

See also
 Ecwid

References

External links
 
 
 

1981 births
Businesspeople in computing
Russian chief executives
Russian computer scientists
Ulyanovsk State Technical University alumni
Living people
Bashkir people
Russian businesspeople in the United States